Antonio Socci (born 18 January 1959, in Siena) is an Italian media personality, journalist and book writer. He is best known for coverage of Catholic Church topics, including general history and subjects such the Secrets of Fatima and the works of Pope John Paul II.

External links 
Official website of Antonio Socci

References 

1959 births
20th-century Italian journalists
Italian male journalists
Italian Roman Catholic writers
Writers from Siena
University of Siena alumni
Living people